Sods is a term used in the Allegheny Mountains of eastern West Virginia for a mountain top meadow or bog.

Sods or Sod's may also refer to:

 Plural of sod
 Sods, original name of Sort Sol, Danish punk rock band
 Sod's law: if something can go wrong, it will
 Sod's Law (album) by Spear of Destiny

See also

 Odds & Sods, a 1974 album by The Who